Sterling is a census-designated place (CDP) in Kenai Peninsula Borough, Alaska, United States. At the 2020 census the population was 5,918, up from 5,617 in 2010. Sterling is the tenth-most populated CDP in Alaska.

Geography
Sterling is located on the western side of the Kenai Peninsula at  (60.529635, -150.797887). It is bordered to the west by Ridgeway, to the southwest by Soldotna, and to the south by Funny River. Soldotna Creek forms the western boundary of the community, and the Kenai River forms the southern boundary.

Alaska Route 1, the Sterling Highway, runs through the community, leading southwest  to the center of Soldotna and east  to Cooper Landing at the outlet of Kenai Lake.

Climate
Sterling has a continental subarctic climate (Köppen Dsc).

Demographics

Sterling first appeared on the 1960 U.S. Census as an unincorporated village. In 1980, it was made a census-designated place (CDP).

As of the census of 2000, there were 4,705 people, 1,676 households, and 1,305 families residing in the CDP. There were 2,554 housing units at an average density of 33.0/sq mi (12.8/km2). The racial makeup of the CDP was 92.7% White, 0.4% Black or African American, 3.3% Alaskan Native, 0.5% Asian, 0.1% Pacific Islander, 0.6% from other races, and 2.5% from two or more races.  1.2% of the population were Hispanic or Latino of any race.

There were 1,676 households, out of which 40.0% had children under the age of 18 living with them, 66.5% were married couples living together, 6.7% had a female householder with no husband present, and 22.1% were non-families. 17.6% of all households were made up of individuals, and 3.4% had someone living alone who was 65 years of age or older.  The average household size was 2.80 and the average family size was 3.16.

In the CDP, the population was spread out, with 30.6% under the age of 18, 6.9% from 18 to 24, 29.0% from 25 to 44, 26.8% from 45 to 64, and 6.7% who were 65 years of age or older.  The median age was 36 years. For every 100 females, there were 108.4 males.  For every 100 females age 18 and over, there were 108.2 males.

The median income for a household in the CDP was $47,700, and the median income for a family was $53,889. Males had a median income of $45,063 versus $27,946 for females. The per capita income for the CDP was $20,741.  About 7.7% of families and 10.0% of the population were below the poverty line, including 11.8% of those under age 18 and 5.9% of those age 65 or over.

History 
The town now known as Sterling was originally called "Naptowne" when it was first opened for settlement in 1947. However, the area—which had a few homesteaders by then—acquired a post office in 1954 which was given the designation of "Sterling" after the Sterling Highway that served the area.

An archaeological site, containing prehistoric Dena'ina house pits, has been discovered near Sterling, showing that the area was inhabited in prehistoric times.

The main industries around Sterling today are support for tourism and sport fishing and hunting.

Parks
Sterling is adjacent to the Kenai National Wildlife Refuge and also two Alaska state parks. Scout Lake State Recreation Site is a  day-use only park. The park has a picnic shelter and a lake stocked with rainbow trout and Arctic grayling. Morgan's Landing State Recreation Area is the headquarters for Alaska State Parks on the Kenai Peninsula.

References

Census-designated places in Alaska
Census-designated places in Kenai Peninsula Borough, Alaska
Archaeological sites in Alaska